Krisztián Kapus (born January 14, 1974) is a Hungarian politician, member of the National Assembly (MP) for Kiskunfélegyháza (Bács-Kiskun County Constituency V) between 2010 and 2014. He served as mayor of his birthplace from October 2010 to October 2014.

Kapus was a member of the Committee on Youth, Social, Family, and Housing Affairs since May 14, 2010. He also served as Chairman of the Subcommittee on Youth since June 28, 2010.

Personal life
He is married and has three children.

References

1974 births
Living people
Fidesz politicians
Members of the National Assembly of Hungary (2010–2014)
Mayors of places in Hungary
People from Kiskunfélegyháza